The 2010–11 Valparaiso Crusaders men's basketball team represented Valparaiso University in the 2010–11 NCAA Division I men's basketball season. Their head coach was Homer Drew. The Crusaders played their home games at the Athletics-Recreation Center and are members of the Horizon League. They finished the season 23–12, 12–6 in Horizon League play. They lost in the semifinals of the 2011 Horizon League men's basketball tournament to Milwaukee. They were invited to the 2011 CollegeInsider.com Tournament where they lost in the first round to Iona.

Roster

Schedule

|-
!colspan=9 style=| Exhibition

|-
!colspan=9 style=| Regular season

|-
!colspan=9 style=| Horizon League tournament

|-
!colspan=9 style=| CollegeInsider.com tournament

References

Valparaiso Crusaders
Valparaiso Beacons men's basketball seasons
Valparaiso
Valp
Valp